Synanthedon scoliaeformis, the Welsh clearwing, is a moth of the family Sesiidae. It is found from almost all of Europe (except the Netherlands, Portugal and the western part of the Balkan Peninsula), east through Russia to Japan.

The wingspan is 30–36 mm. Females have an orange tail, while males are darker brown. Both have two narrow yellow rings on their abdomen. Adults are on wing in June and July and fly during the day.

The larvae feed on Betula pubescens and Betula pendula. They bore into mature trees and feed on the bark within.

Subspecies
Synanthedon scoliaeformis scoliaeformis
Synanthedon scoliaeformis japonica Špatenka & Arita, 1992

References

External links

Lepiforum.de

Moths described in 1789
Sesiidae
Moths of Japan
Moths of Europe
Taxa named by Moritz Balthasar Borkhausen